Mohammad Ziaur Rahman (born 2 December 1986 in Khulna) is a first-class and List A cricketer from Bangladesh. He is a right-handed batsman and right arm fast medium bowler. He is known as the "Hit man" of Bangladesh cricket team for hitting sixes in every game.

Debut years
He made his debut for Khulna Division in 2004/05 and played through the 2006/07 season. He also appeared for Bangladesh Under-19s in 2003/04 and the Bangladesh Cricket Board President's XI and  Bangladesh Cricket Board Academy in 2006/07.

Domestic career
In Bangladesh Cricket League 2012, he scored unbeaten 152 off 118 balls vs South Zone, where he smashed 15 sixes. Highest by any Bangladeshi player in any cricket format. 

He has twice taken 5 wickets in an innings, with a best of 5 for 82 against Dhaka Division. He also took 5 for 24 against Sylhet Division in a one-day game. He made his ODI debut on 23 March 2013 against Sri Lanka in Hambantota and scored a golden duck.

In October 2018, he was named in the squad for the Comilla Victorians team, following the draft for the 2018–19 Bangladesh Premier League.

International career

References

External links
 

Bangladeshi cricketers
Bangladesh Test cricketers
Bangladesh One Day International cricketers
Bangladesh Twenty20 International cricketers
Khulna Division cricketers
Rajshahi Division cricketers
Rajshahi Royals cricketers
Living people
1986 births
People from Khulna
Asian Games medalists in cricket
Cricketers at the 2014 Asian Games
Asian Games bronze medalists for Bangladesh
Medalists at the 2014 Asian Games
Chattogram Challengers cricketers
Rangpur Riders cricketers
Abahani Limited cricketers
Prime Doleshwar Sporting Club cricketers
Bangladesh South Zone cricketers
Barisal Division cricketers
Sheikh Jamal Dhanmondi Club cricketers
Comilla Victorians cricketers